Poeta Lòpez Anglada is a passenger / car ferry owned and operated by Baleària.  The ship is named after the Spanish writer Luis López Anglada.

History

SNCF 
Champs Elysées  was built in 1984 by Chantiers Dubigeon S.A., Prairie-au-Duc, Nantes, for SNCF's Calais-Dover services, which were shared with their Sealink partners. She also operated between Boulogne-Dover. In 1990, ownership of Champs Elysées was transferred to Societé Propietaire des Navaires (SPN), in which Stena Line took a 49% interest (Stena having acquired the UK-owned Sealink operation).

SPN
In 1990, ownership of Champs Elysées was transferred to Societé Propietaire des Navaires (SPN), in which Stena Line took a 49% interest (Stena having acquired the UK-owned Sealink operation). Champs Elysées was transferred to the Newhaven-Dieppe service, which at that time was run by SPN.

Stena Sealink
In 1992 Champs Elysées was chartered to Sealink Stena Line when they took over the Newhaven-Dieppe service, for which she was renamed Stena Parisien. In 1997 the charter was ended, and Stena Parisien entered service between Dover-Calais for SeaFrance as SeaFrance Manet.

SeaFrance

In 1997, the Stena Line charter was ended, and Stena Parisien entered service between Dover-Calais for SeaFrance as the SeaFrance Manet. In 1999, Stena Line sold their 49% back to SPN. On 27 December 2007, SeaFrance announced that they have purchased a new vessel to replace both the Seafrance Manet and Seafrance Renoir. The SeaFrance Manet was retained by SeaFrance as a spare vessel in the fleet, until 2009. 29 April 2008 saw the final sailing of SeaFrance Manet between Dover – Calais. Afterwards, she was laid up in Calais.

Stena Line

On 8 July 2009, Stena Line officially announced they were purchasing the SeaFrance Manet to operate on their Belfast – Stranraer route. The Stena Navigator was withdrawn from service with on 16 November 2011.

Baleària
Three months after the closure of the Stranraer route, The Stena Navigator departed Belfast on 17 February bound for the Astander shipyard in Santander. The vessel was repainted in the Baleària livery and renamed Daniya.

She entered service for Balaeria during April operating out of Denia on the routes San Antonio–Palma and San Antonio–Barcelona, with much of her Stena interior still in place. 

In November 2013, Daniya was renamed Poeta Lòpez Anglada and moved to the Algeciras–Ceuta route. She was quickly moved on to the Alcudia-Ciutadella route before returning to the Algeciras–Ceuta route in July 2014.

In February 2016 the ship was fitted with a new bow ramp to improve the loading and discharge of vehicles. The work was carried out at Astilleros del Guadalquivir in Seville. At the same time she was also surveyed and repainted.

Sister ship
The Stena Navigator had one sister ship, the SeaFrance Renoir which was scrapped in 2011. They are close sister ships but they aren't identical ferries. For example, windows on the Renoir were smaller than in the Daniya.

References

External links
 

Ferries of Spain
1983 ships
Ships built by Chantiers Dubigeon